The Petaling Jaya Stadium, also known as the MBPJ Stadium is a multi-purpose stadium in the suburb of Kelana Jaya in Petaling Jaya, Selangor, Malaysia. The stadium was opened in 1996 and has a capacity of 25,000. It was built in time for the 1998 Commonwealth Games and hosted the Games' rugby union matches.

The stadium is mostly used for local football matches. Current tenants for the stadium are Petaling Jaya City F.C., Selangor F.C., Petaling Jaya Rangers and MISC-MIFA.

History
Petaling Jaya Stadium was opened in 1996 and has a capacity of 25,000. It was built in time for the 1998 Commonwealth Games and hosted the Games' rugby union matches.

The stadium previously served as the home stadium to MPPJ FC, the first football club in Malaysian football competition to win the Malaysia Cup until its quietus in August 2006. After that, the stadium mostly being used for various local event including local school events, such as Sports Day, private event, concert and others. The stadium also being used for Malaysia local rugby union competition.

The stadium was called MPPJ Stadium and then as MBPJ Stadium after Petaling Jaya has been granted to become a city status and later on has been known as Petaling Jaya Stadium.

In 2011, the stadium has been used as the start and finish line of the 2011 Petaling Jaya Half-Marathon.

In 2013, popular model reality show Asia's Next Top Model filmed its Cycle 2 Episode 4 at the MBPJ Stadium.

In February 2014, the stadium was also used for the Sasuke Asean Open Cup 2014. Team USA won it, Team Japan in 2nd place and Team Malaysia in 3rd place.

In first quarter of 2014, this stadium has also been used as home venue for Selangor F.C. whilst Shah Alam Stadium undergoes maintenance for pitch replacement. 

In June 2014, the stadium undergoes renovation to improve its facilities after has been neglected for a long time.

In December 2016, PJ Rangers has announced to adopt the stadium as their home ground for the 2017 season onwards. The City Council has approved PJ Rangers and MISC-MIFA of stadium tenancy for 2017 season.

The stadium was used for the 2018 AFC U-16 Championship. 

In early 2020, regarding the temporary closure of Shah Alam Stadium, the home of the Red Giants Selangor F.C. due to major renovation and rebuild workSelangor F.C. play at MBPJ Stadium as an interim home ground since 2021 season until present.

See also
 Sport in Malaysia
 Football in Malaysia

References

Football venues in Malaysia
Athletics (track and field) venues in Malaysia
Multi-purpose stadiums in Malaysia
Petaling Jaya
Rugby union stadiums in Malaysia
Commonwealth Games rugby union venues
Sports venues in Selangor
Petaling Jaya Rangers F.C.
Petaling Jaya City FC
World Rugby Sevens Series venues